Navarro County is a county in the U.S. state of Texas.  As of the 2020 census, the population was 52,624. Its county seat is Corsicana. The county is named for José Antonio Navarro, a Tejano leader in the Texas Revolution who signed the Texas Declaration of Independence.

Navarro County comprises the Corsicana micropolitan statistical area, which is also part of the Dallas-Fort Worth, TX combined statistical area.

History
Navarro County was formed from Robertson County in 1846.

Geography

Major highways
  Interstate 45
  U.S. Highway 287
  State Highway 14
  State Highway 22
  State Highway 31
  State Highway 75
  State Highway 309

Adjacent counties
 Henderson County (northeast)
 Freestone County (southeast)
 Limestone County (south)
 Hill County (southwest)
 Ellis County (northwest)

Demographics

Note: the US Census treats Hispanic/Latino as an ethnic category. This table excludes Latinos from the racial categories and assigns them to a separate category. Hispanics/Latinos can be of any race.

As of the census of 2000,  45,124 people, 16,491 households, and 11,906 families were residing in the county.  The population density was 45 people per square mile (17/km2).  The 18,449 housing units averaged 18 per square mile (7/km2).  The racial makeup of the county was 70.84% White, 16.79% African American, 0.46% Native American, 0.47% Asian, 0.33% Pacific Islander, 9.45% from other races, and 1.65% from two or more races.  Hispanics or Latinos of any race were 15.75% of the population.

Of the 16,491 households, 34.00% had children under 18 living with them, 55.70% were married couples living together, 12.20% had a female householder with no husband present, and 27.80% were not families. About 24.10% of all households were made up of individuals, and 12.00% had someone living alone who was 65 or older.  The average household size was 2.65, and the average family size was 3.14.

In the county, the population was distributed as 27.20% under 18, 9.90% from 18 to 24, 26.90% from 25 to 44, 21.50% from 45 to 64, and 14.40% who were 65 or older.  The median age was 35 years. For every 100 females, there were 97.00 males.  For every 100 females age 18 and over, there were 92.70 males.

Males had a median income of $30,112 versus $20,972 for females. The per capita income for the county was $15,266. About 13.90% of families and 18.20% of the population were below the poverty line, including 23.10% of those under age 18 and 14.90% of those age 65 or over.

Media

Navarro County is part of the Dallas-Fort Worth coverage area, including stations KDFW-TV, KXAS-TV, WFAA-TV, KTVT-TV, KERA-TV, KTXA-TV, KDFI-TV, KDAF-TV, and KFWD-TV. The county is also near Waco, so Waco/Temple/Killeen stations also provide coverage for Navarro County. These include: KCEN-TV, KWTX-TV, KXXV-TV, KDYW, and KWKT-TV. East Texas NBC affiliate KETK-TV from the Jacksonville/Tyler area provides coverage for Navarro County, as well.

The Corsicana Daily Sun is the area's newspaper.

Communities

Cities

 Angus
 Barry
 Corsicana (county seat)
 Eureka
 Frost
 Goodlow
 Kerens
 Rice
 Richland

Towns

 Blooming Grove
 Dawson
 Emhouse
 Mildred
 Mustang
 Navarro
 Oak Valley
 Powell
 Retreat
 Streetman (mostly in Freestone County)

Unincorporated communities
 Chatfield
 Emmett
 Montfort
 Purdon
 Pursley
 Roane
 Rural Shade

Ghost town
 Pisgah

Politics

Government 
Navarro County, like all Texas counties, is governed by a Commissioners Court, which consists of the county judge, who is elected county-wide and presides over the full court, and four commissioners, who are elected in each of the county's four precincts

County commissioners

County officials

Constables

Justices of the Peace

Community College Board of Trustees

See also

 National Register of Historic Places listings in Navarro County, Texas
 Recorded Texas Historic Landmarks in Navarro County

References

External links
 Navarro County government's website
 Navarro County Office of Emergency Management website
 Navarro County in Handbook of Texas Online at the University of Texas
 Navarro County Genealogical Society

 
1846 establishments in Texas
Populated places established in 1846